The Museum of Cultures of Lugano (MUSEC) was inaugurated on September the 23rd 1989 with the aim of preserving most of the ethnic artworks collected by Serge Birignoni and coming in particular from the Far East, India, South-East Asia, Indonesia and Oceania.

Over the years, MUSEC has increased its collections thanks to numerous donations.

The museum was founded under the name of Museum of Extra-European Cultures, in 2007 it was renamed Museum of Cultures and in 2017 MUSEC. It is part of the cultural centre of the city of Lugano and its headquarters is the central Villa Malpensata. Access to the museum is possible both from Via Mazzini and Riva Caccia.

Villa Malpensata
In 2017 MUSEC moves to Villa Malpensata. The Villa was built by the Caccia family in the mid-eighteenth century according to the style that at that time characterized the monumental and scenic rearrangement of the banks of the great alpine lakes. Used from 1893 onwards as a museum, from 1973 it became the permanent seat of the Art Museum and temporary exhibitions of various kinds.

The restoration designed in 2014 to give MUSEC a larger and more central location involved, in addition to the main building, both the two buildings flanking it to the north - intended for offices and the Research and Documentation Centre - and the terraced garden to the south, reorganized to house the MUSEC's outdoor spaces and the raised terrace that leads to the new main entrance. All the spaces are rearranged according to international climatic and museum-technical standards and equipped with the best safety conditions.

History 
Since its opening to the public on September 23, 1989, and until 2016, the Heleneum was the seat of MUSEC. The Heleneum is a villa on the shores of Lake Lugano built between 1930 and 1934 on the architectural model of the "Petit Trianon" in Versailles by Hélène Bieber, a strong-willed cosmopolitan lady who wanted to transform it into a centre for social and cultural entertainment and who lived there until 1967. Especially because of the economic crisis of the 1930s, Hélène Bieber failed in her intentions and the Heleneum remained a sparsely inhabited dwelling until, in 1969, it was bought by the Municipality of Castagnola, now a district of the City of Lugano.

From 1969 to 1971 the Heleneum was the venue for the piano courses held by Carlo Florindo Semini, Franco Ferrara and Arturo Benedetti Michelangeli. From 1971 to 1973, the villa hosted the summer courses and seminars of the Ticino Institute of High Studies, directed by Elémire Zolla, which brought together important scholars of different disciplines on the themes of religious knowledge.

Later, until 1976, the Heleneum was the seat of the Centre for Semantic and Cognitive Studies of the Dalle Molle Institute, which operated in the field of artificial intelligence, at that time in its early days, and which organized various seminars attended by scholars and researchers from all over the world. The villa was finally the kindergarten of Castagnola and was used as a set for film productions in which Bruno Ganz and Aldo Fabrizi, among others, took part.

The Museo delle Culture conserves most of the ethnic art that Serge Brignoni collected between 1930 and 1985. The collection shows the link between the creative forms of the "South Seas" culture and the artistic Avant-Garde of the 19th century that were inspired by those objects. The collection reflects Brignoni's selection of well-crafted objects that show an appreciation of art forms from a very different culture. The genres and the geographical origins of the Brignoni collection works are similar to those found in leading European, North American and Australian collections from the first half of the 20th century. Moreover, the collection includes all of the areas that are considered fundamental for a contemporary collection of the time.

Collection
The Brignoni collection

MUSEC opened its doors in 1989 thanks to the bequest of ethnic works of art that the Swiss artist and collector Serge Brignoni (1903-2002) collected in the long period between 1930 and the mid-1980s, when he decided to donate them to the city of Lugano. The collection thus bears witness, first of all, to the link between the forms of creativity of the "South Seas" cultures and the object that the artistic avant-gardes of the 20th century discussed in their circles and tried to create in their works. The works are the expression of a refined choice that privileges the best manufactured articles and knows how to recognize phenomenologically the expressions of an art not yet acculturated. The genres and geographical origins, albeit with some significant exceptions, reflect those most widespread in the European, Australian and North American collections of the mid-twentieth century and there is almost no lack of "pieces" of what were considered the indispensable objects of collecting at the time. Particularly evident is the taste for sculptural works, marked by expressionistic content and creative methods and by a particular richness of drawing and pictorial decoration.

Other collections

Following the opening of the museum and especially since its relaunch in 2005, the MUSEC hosts and enhances many other Collections, some of which are listed below: the Ceschin Pilone-Fagioli Collection (hand-painted Japanese albumen photographs, dating back to the late nineteenth and early twentieth century); the Pilone Collection (includes over 400 works or groups of works of Chinese theatre, including painted masks and faces, headgear, make-up and costume accessories, fans, musical instruments and entire sets); the Nodari collection and fund (a thousand works of art and objects of material culture, two large river boats, about 6. 000 photographs, 71 documentary films and over sixty hours of sound recordings on cassette or tape, collected in the field, during a series of trips to Africa - especially in the Upper Congo - in the 1950s and 1960s) and the Antonini Collection (over 1100 ornamental combs from all over the world). For the complete list please see

Exhibitions
MUSEC preserves and enhances art collections from the Far East, India, Southeast Asia and Oceania. The new headquarters, the eighteenth-century Villa Malpensata, located on the lakeside promenade of Lugano, provides for an ever-changing setting following the most modern canons of museology. The museum, an important research centre on the anthropology of art, simultaneously offers the public at least three exhibitions able to communicate, each according to its own thematic peculiarities, the richness and the overall articulation of its cultural project.

- The "Spazio Tesoro", located at the entrance of the museum and with free access, accompanies the visitor on a periodically renewed route, with works from the Brignoni Collection and the other main collections of the museum. An itinerary full of meanings allows the visitor, among other things, to interact dynamically with the themes and works presented in the other exhibition spaces of the museum, sometimes anticipating them, sometimes providing valuable keys of interpretation, useful to grasp the unity of the museographic project.

- The "Spazio Maraini" presents the exhibitions of the "Esovisioni" cycle dedicated to travel photography and the theme of exoticism in the work of great photographers.

-The "Spazio Cielo" is entirely dedicated to hosting the exhibitions of the "Cameredarte" project, dedicated to new acquisitions, to collectors who collaborate with MUSEC and to contemporary artists who have approached the museum's activities over the years.

- Inside the "Spazio Mostre" which occupies two floors of the museum, the "Altrarti" cycles dedicated to the various genres of ethnic arts are exhibited in rotation; "OrientArt" which deals with the different forms of derivation and integration between contemporary art and local cultural traditions from which artists from Asia, Africa and Oceania draw their languages and finally the exhibitions of the "Ethnopassion" cycle, dedicated to the analysis of the role that tribal, oriental and popular arts had in the development of the languages of the European avant-garde.

Activities and services
The activities of MUSEC are based on the scientific research carried out by its staff and other collaborators, in connection with museums, universities and cultural institutions all over the world. For this reason, the museum is also the venue for seminars and advanced training activities: university lectures, refresher courses and workshops on anthropology and museography. MUSEC's storerooms can be visited by appointment and house a conservation and technical museum laboratory equipped for the museum's needs and for any specialist advice to third parties.

The educational offer is carried out by specialized personnel and includes workshops for children, guided tours, conference visits and other forms of dissemination that can also be tailored to the needs of users.

By appointment MUSEC also offers visitors a guided tour of the villa. The museum also provides its architectural spaces for meetings, special events and as a set for photo shoots and filming.

Bibliography
Cometti, Marta, Guida. Museo delle Culture di Lugano, Edizioni Città di Lugano/MCL (Antropunti/3), Lugano, 2009. .
Vago, Valeria, In viaggio per i mari del Sud. Guida per ragazzi al Museo delle Culture, Edizioni Città di Lugano/MCL (Antropunti/2), Lugano, 2009. .

References

External links
 
 Museo delle Culture official website

Cultures
Museums in Ticino
Lugano
Art museums established in 1989
Museum of Cultures
Culture in Lugano